The Hamburg Mark refers to two distinct currencies issued in the city of Hamburg until 1875:
 The Hamburg Mark Banco, a bank money and an accounting unit, and
 The Hamburg Mark Courant, an actual coin.

Each mark is divided into 16 schilling, each of 12 pfennig. Three marks were equal to a Reichsthaler, Germany's main unit of currency which the Hamburger Bank (Bank of Hamburg) defined and maintained until 1875.

Hamburg Mark Banco

The Hamburg Mark Banco was a form of bank money created by the Hamburger Bank in 1619 in order to provide a more reliable medium of exchange in the midst of the monetary chaos of the Kipper und Wipperzeit. It accepted silver of verified weight from customers and credited their accounts with a Reichsthaler equivalent unit called the Hamburg Reichsthaler Banco, equal to 3 Hamburg Marks Banco and which subdivided further as
 1 Reichsthaler Banco = 3 Marks Banco, each of 16 schillings, and also as
 1 Reichsthaler Banco = 0.4 Pound Flemish, each of 20 schillings Flemish or 240 grotes Flemish.

This Mark Banco turned out to be one of Europe's most stable currencies. While the Reichsthaler was originally defined as 25.984 grams (th a Cologne mark, or 233.856 g) fine silver, the Bank of Amsterdam's lower standard  for the Dutch rijksdaalder of 25.4 g prevailed for the next two centuries. From 1770 the Hamburger Bank accepted bullion and coin, buying one Cologne mark of fine silver for 27 marks banco (9 thalers, or 25.40 g per thaler), and selling it for 27 marks (9 thalers, or 25.28 g per thaler). The reichsthaler banco of Hamburg and Amsterdam was also equivalent to the Danish rigsdaler specie and the Norwegian rigsdaler specie.

The Vienna Monetary Treaty of 1857 unified the various German currencies with the Vereinsthaler of 16 g fine silver, with Hamburg's Reichsthaler Banco worth 1.5169 Vereinsthaler. With full German unification in 1871 and the introduction of a uniform German gold mark currency in 1873 there was little need for an institution like the Hamburger Bank to verify the value of the currency of a unified Germany. The bank was closed in 1875 with the Reichsthaler Banco or 3 Marks Banco converted to 4.5 gold marks.

Hamburg Mark Courant or Currency

Even with the existence of standardized currency denominated in Reichsthalers and Marks Banco, it was desired to issue coins (or courant) in Northern Germany valued at a fraction of these standard units. Hamburg first issued local currency in 1667 at a tale of 1 Cologne Mark = 10.5 thalers courant = 31.5 marks courant (the Zinnaische standard). In 1690 it then decided to follow the standard of Lübeck issued at a tale of 1 Cologne Mark = 11 thalers = 34 marks courant. This Hamburg Mark Courant was worth 27.625/34 = th of a Hamburg Mark Banco (or 6.88 g fine silver) and was also divided into 16 schillings courant.

A mostly similar currency system was used in Denmark, Norway and Schleswig-Holstein, but with a slightly lower thaler courant worth  the Reichsthaler specie, so that the latter equalled 60 schillings courant (or 120 skillings Danske in Denmark and Norway).

Prussian thalers and Vereinsthalers became more common in Hamburg after 1840 and began to be exchanged for a higher price of 2 marks courant, thus implying a lower tale of 35 marks courant or 6.67 g fine silver. In 1875 the Hamburg Mark Courant was retired and converted to 1.2 German gold marks.

See also

 Reichsthaler
 Prussian thaler
 Hamburger Bank
 :de:Mark Banco

References

External links
Images and history from Sean Breazeal

Currencies of Germany
History of Hamburg
1873 disestablishments in Germany
Coins of the Holy Roman Empire